Rathouisiidae is a family of carnivorous air-breathing land slugs, terrestrial pulmonate gastropod mollusks in the superfamily Veronicelloidea, the leatherleaf slugs and their allies.

This family has no subfamilies according to the Taxonomy of the Gastropoda by Bouchet & Rocroi, 2005.

The scientific name Rathouisiidae is based on the name of the type genus, Rathouisia which in turn was named in honor of the French Jesuit Père Charles Rathouis (1834–1890), who made scientific drawings for Pierre Marie Heude.

Genera 
Genera within the family Rathouisiidae include:
 Atopos Simroth, 1891
 Barkeriella 
 Granulilimax Minato, 1989
 Rathouisia Heude, 1884 – type genus of the family

Distribution 
The predatory carnivorous slugs in the genus Atopos are found in peninsular Malaysia, Sumatra, Borneo, New Guinea, northeast Australia and, recently, Singapore.

Feeding habits
Rathouisiidae are carnivorous and feed on other gastropods, but also on fungi and plants.

Bornean Atopos specialising in Opisthostoma are known to tailor their approach to the size of the prey. They hold small snails with the shells aperture-upward with the front of its foot and eat their way down. Larger ones scrape away the shell to allow access through the spire. This behaviour is thought to drive the evolution of shell ornamentation in Opisthostoma.

References

External links 
 

 
Gastropod families
Taxa named by Pierre Marie Heude